Bedok Group Representation Constituency (Traditional Chinese: 勿洛集選區;Simplified Chinese: 勿洛集选区) is a defunct Group Representation Constituency in Bedok, Singapore that existed from 1988 to 1997.

Members of Parliament

Candidates and results

Elections in 1990s

Elections in 1980s

See also
East Coast GRC
Bedok SMC
Ulu Bedok SMC

References

1991 General Election's result
1988 General Election's result

Singaporean electoral divisions
Bedok